Rolf Zehetbauer (13 February 1929 – 23 January 2022) was a German production designer, art director and set decorator. Zehetbauer won an Academy Award in the category Best Art Direction for the film Cabaret. He died on 23 January 2022, at the age of 92.

Selected filmography

 Love and Blood (1951)
 The Imaginary Invalid (1952)
 Knall and Fall as Detectives (1953)
 The Charming Young Lady (1953)
 The Telephone Operator (1954)
 The Mosquito (1954)
 Love Without Illusions (1955)
 Alibi (1955)
 Love (1956)
 Adorable Arabella (1959)
 My Schoolfriend (1960)
 The Bird Seller (1962)
 My Daughter and I (1963)
 A Man in His Prime (1964)
 Raumpatrouille - Die phantastischen Abenteuer des Raumschiffes Orion (1965)
 The Last Escape (1970)
 Cabaret (1972)
 Cry of the Black Wolves (1972)
 Twilight's Last Gleaming (1977)
 The Serpent's Egg (1977)
 Das Boot (1981)
 Querelle (1982)
 The NeverEnding Story (1984)
 Enemy Mine (1985)

See also
 List of German-speaking Academy Award winners and nominees

Notes

References

External links
 
 

1929 births
2022 deaths
German production designers
German art directors
German set decorators
Best Art Direction Academy Award winners
Best Production Design BAFTA Award winners
Film people from Munich